The 1987–88 Kansas Jayhawks men's basketball team represented the University of Kansas for the NCAA Division I men's intercollegiate basketball season of 1987–1988.  The team won the 1987–1988 NCAA Division I men's basketball championship, the second in the school's history. They were led by Larry Brown in his fifth and final season as head coach.  Their star player, Danny Manning, earned the team the nickname "Danny and the Miracles" because of the Jayhawks' improbable tournament run after an 11-loss season, the most ever by a national champion.  The team played its home games in Allen Fieldhouse in Lawrence, Kansas. In the last three games of the NCAA tournament, the Jayhawks avenged their three home losses to Kansas State, Duke, and Oklahoma.

This season also marked the creation by a group of KU students of the now famous "Beware of THE PHOG" banner. It was first displayed for the Duke game on February 20, 1988 and then again for that season's final home game on March 5, the Senior Night celebrations honoring Danny Manning and the other KU seniors, Archie Marshall and Chris Piper. It came down after that, and the students gave the banner to Phog Allen's granddaughter Judy Morris.  Morris told Kansas Assistant Athletic Director Floyd Temple she thought the banner should remain a fixture in Allen Fieldhouse, and Temple agreed.

Roster

Schedule

|-
!colspan=9 style=| Regular Season

|-
!colspan=9 style=| Big 8 Tournament

|-
!colspan=9 style=|NCAA Tournament

Rankings

Awards and honors
 Larry Brown, Naismith College Coach of the Year
 Danny Manning, NCAA Men's MOP Award
 Danny Manning, Naismith College Player of the Year
 Danny Manning, John R. Wooden Award

Team players drafted into the NBA

References

Kansas Jayhawks men's basketball seasons
Kansas
NCAA Division I men's basketball tournament championship seasons
NCAA Division I men's basketball tournament Final Four seasons
Kansas
Kansas Jay
Kansas Jay